"Old Man & Me (When I Get to Heaven)" is a song by American rock group Hootie & the Blowfish. It was released in April 1996 as the lead single from their second album, Fairweather Johnson. In the United States, it peaked at number 13 on the Billboard Hot 100, number 18 on the Billboard Adult Contemporary chart, and number six on the Billboard Mainstream Rock chart. The song also reached number one in Canada, the band's third and final single to do so.

Background
The song first appeared in an earlier version on the band's 1993 self-released EP, Kootchypop. The EP's liner notes explain the origin of the song:

I was walking on Santee Street in Columbia leaving Monterrey Jack's and an older man came up to me. He asked for some change and me being in a bad mood (not me) I gave him some smart ass "BUM" remark. I went for a block on my way to the Elbow Room and I felt like the biggest pompous asshole. So I woke up the next morning and wrote this fictitious conversation about his life because you never know what has happened to these unfortunate people.

Music video
The music video was directed by Dan Winters and filmed in Columbia, South Carolina. The scenes of the mill ruins were filmed in Rockingham, North Carolina, at the Great Falls Mill Ruins and the waterfall behind the ruins.

Track listings

US 7-inch vinyl and cassette single
A. "Old Man & Me (When I Get to Heaven)" (album version) – 4:26
B. "Before the Heartache Rolls In" – 4:26

US enhanced CD single
 "Old Man & Me (When I Get to Heaven)" (album version) – 4:26
 "Before the Heartache Rolls In" – 4:26
 "Old Man & Me (When I Get to Heaven)" (video)

European and Australian CD single
 "Old Man & Me (When I Get to Heaven)" (LP version) – 4:26
 "Old Man & Me (When I Get to Heaven)" (radio edit) – 3:59
 "Before the Heartache Rolls In" (LP version) – 4:26

UK CD single
 "Old Man & Me (When I Get to Heaven)" (LP version) – 4:26
 "Before the Heartache Rolls In" – 4:23
 "Only Wanna Be with You" (live) – 6:07
 "Time" – 5:27

Charts

Weekly charts

Year-end charts

Decade-end charts

References

1996 songs
1996 singles
Hootie & the Blowfish songs
Songs written by Darius Rucker
Songs written by Mark Bryan
Songs written by Jim Sonefeld
Song recordings produced by Don Gehman
Atlantic Records singles
RPM Top Singles number-one singles